"If Not for You" is a song written by Jerry Chesnut and recorded by American country singer George Jones. It was released as a single on the Musicor label and reached No. 6 on the Billboard country singles chart in 1969. Like many of his biggest hits of the period, it is a love ballad. The song extols the virtues of a supportive lover. Chestnut also composed the Jones hit "A Good Year for the Roses".

Chart performance

References

George Jones songs
Songs written by Jerry Chesnut
1969 songs
Song recordings produced by Pappy Daily